Two ships in the United States Navy have been named USS Guerriere, after  which  had defeated in battle during the War of 1812.

  was a frigate launched in 1814. She saw service in the Second Barbary War and was decommissioned in 1831
  was a frigate launched in 1865. She served in the American Civil War and was decommissioned in 1872.

United States Navy ship names